Rino Gasparrini (born 8 April 1992) is an Italian cyclist, who last rode for Italian amateur team Calzaturieri Montegranaro–Marini Silvano.

Major results

2014
 1st Stage 1 Vuelta al Táchira
 2nd Circuito del Porto
 7th Banja Luka Belgrade I
2015
 4th Trofej Umag
 5th Circuito del Porto
2017
 8th Circuito del Porto

References

External links

1992 births
Living people
Italian male cyclists
Sportspeople from the Province of Ascoli Piceno
Cyclists from Marche